Horacio Salinas Álvarez (born 8 July 1951 in Lautaro, Cautín Province) is a Chilean guitarist and composer. He is cofounder and musical director of the Chilean group Inti-Illimani Histórico. He has a huge repertory of compositions that involves folk, Andean music, protest music, world music, contemporary classical music and many Latin American styles and fusions.  In 1973, his group was touring in Europe when Pinochet seized power in Chile, after which they had to stay in exile for years. He has played with many international musicians notably the Australian classical guitarist John Williams.

Discography

Solo 
La música de Horacio Salinas (1986 - Alerce)
Trazos de cielo sur (1992 - Autoedición)
Música para cine, vol. 1 (1997 - EMI Odeon)
Remos en el agua (2003 - Warner Music)

As director of Inti-Illimani 
Si Somos Americanos - 1969
Voz para el camino - 1969
Por la CUT - 1969
A la Revolución Mexicana - 1969
Inti-Illimani - 1969
Inti-Illimani - 1970
Canto al Programa - 1970
Autores Chilenos - 1971
Canto para una Semilla - 1972
Canto de Pueblos Andinos, Vol. 1 - 1973
Viva Chile! - 1973
La Nueva Canción Chilena (Inti-Illimani 2) - 1974
Canto de Pueblos Andinos (Inti-Illimani 3) - 1975
Hacia La Libertad (Inti-Illimani 4) - 1975
Canto de Pueblos Andinos, Vol. 2 (Inti-Illimani 5) - 1976
Chile Resistencia (Inti-Illimani 6) - 1977
Canto per una Seme - 1978
Canto para una Semilla - 1978
Canción para Matar una Culebra - 1979
Jag Vill Tacka Livet (Gracias a la Vida) - 1980 (con Arja Saijonmaa)
En Directo - 1980
Palimpsesto - 1981
The Flight of the Condor - 1982
Con la Razón y la Fuerza - 1982 (con Patricio Manns)
Imaginación - 1984
Sing to me the Dream - 1984 (con Holly Near)
Return of the Condor - 1984
La Muerte no Va Conmigo - 1985 (con Patricio Manns)
De Canto y Baile - 1986
Fragmentos de un Sueño - 1987 (con John Williams y Paco Peña)
Leyenda - 1990 (con John Williams y Paco Peña)
Andadas - 1992
Arriesgare la Piel - 1996
Lejanía - 1998
Amar de Nuevo - 1999
Sinfónico - 1999
La Rosa de los Vientos - 1999
Inti-illimani Interpreta a Víctor Jara - 2000
Antología en Vivo - 2000
Inti-Quila. Música en la Memoria. Juntos en Chile - 2005 Inti-Illimani Histórico
Antología en vivo - 2006 Inti-Illimani Histórico

Tributo a Inti-Illimani Histórico. A la Salud de la Música - 2009 (Obra Colectiva) Inti-Illimani Histórico

References

1951 births
Living people
People from Lautaro
Chilean guitarists
Chilean male guitarists
Latin American folk singers
Nueva canción musicians
Chilean composers
Chilean male composers